The 1894 College Football All-America team is composed of college football players who were selected as All-Americans for the 1894 college football season, as selected by Caspar Whitney for Harper's Weekly and the Walter Camp Football Foundation. Whitney began publishing his All-America Team in 1889, and his list, which was considered the official All-America Team, was published in Harper's Weekly from 1891 to 1896.

All-American selections for 1894

Key
 WC = Walter Camp Football Foundation
 CW = Caspar Whitney, published in Harper's Weekly magazine.
 LES = Leslie's Weekly by John D. Merrill
 Bold = Consensus All-American

Ends
 Frank Hinkey, Yale (College Football Hall of Fame) (WC; CW; LES)
 Charles Gelbert, Penn (College Football Hall of Fame) (WC; CW; LES)

Tackles
 Bert Waters, Harvard (WC; CW; LES)
 Langdon Lea, Princeton (College Football Hall of Fame) (WC; CW)
 Anson M. Beard, Yale (LES)

Guards
 Art Wheeler, Princeton (College Football Hall of Fame) (WC; CW)
 Bill Hickock, Yale (College Football Hall of Fame) (WC; CW)
 William C. Mackie, Harvard (LES)
 Charles Wharton, Penn (LES)

Centers

 Phillip Stillman, Yale (WC; CW; LES)

Quarterback
 George Adee, Yale (WC; CW)
 Bob Wrenn, Harvard (LES)

Halfbacks
 Alden Knipe, Penn (WC; CW; LES)
 George Brooke, Penn (College Football Hall of Fame) (WC; CW; LES)

Fullback
 Frank Butterworth, Yale (WC; CW; LES)

References

All-America Team
College Football All-America Teams